Storžič is the highest mountain in the western part of the Kamnik–Savinja Alps. The top is a nicely shaped cone, from which the mountain got its name. Storžič has a good panoramic view. To the south are the Ljubljana Basin, Mount Krim, the Javornik Hills, Mount Snežnik, the Nanos Plateau, and the Škofja Loka Hills. To the west are the Julian Alps with prominent Mount Triglav. To the north are the Karawanks with Mount Stol, 
Mount Begunjščica, and Mount Košuta. To the east are the Jezersko Cirque, Mount Grintovec, the Kalce Ridge and Mount Krvavec.

Starting points
 Bašelj (Preddvor)
 Gozd (Tržič)
 Lom pod Storžičem (Tržič)
 Preddvor
 Spodnje Jezersko (Jezersko)
 Trstenik (Kranj)

Routes
 4 h: from the Storžič Lodge, over Male Poljane via Psico
 3½ h: from the Storžič Lodge, over Škarjeve peči
 3 h: from the Storžič Lodge, through Žrelo, over Transverzala
 1¾ h: from Planinski dom na Kališču hut, over Transverzala
 4½ h: from Zavetišče v Gozdu hut, passing Mala Poljana
 4½ h: from Spodnje Jezersko, over Bašelj Peak (Bašeljskiski vrh)
 3½ h: from Trstenik, passing Velika Poljana or Javornik
 3 h: from Bašelj, passing Koče nad Malo Pečjo over ridge on an unmarked route

External links 

 Storžič route description
 Storžič on hribi.net Route Description and Photos (slo)
 Summitpost.org

Mountains of the Kamnik–Savinja Alps
Mountains of Upper Carniola
Two-thousanders of Slovenia